Daultons Branch is a stream in Marion County in the U.S. state of Missouri.

Daultons Branch has the name of the local Daulton family.

See also
List of rivers of Missouri

References

Rivers of Marion County, Missouri
Rivers of Missouri